USS LST-934 was an  in the United States Navy. Like many of her class, she was not named and is properly referred to by her hull designation.

Construction
LST-934 was laid down on 23 June 1944, at Hingham, Massachusetts, by the Bethlehem-Hingham Shipyard; launched on 26 July 1944; and commissioned on 20 August 1944.

Service history
During World War II, LST-934 was assigned to the Asiatic-Pacific theater and participated in the Palawan Island landings in March 1945, the Mindanao Island landings in March and April 1945, the Visayan Island landings in April 1945, and the assault and occupation of Okinawa Gunto in  June 1945.

Following the war, LST-934 performed occupation duty in the Far East and saw service in China until early May 1946. She was decommissioned on 13 May 1946, and transferred to the State Department that same day. On 19 June 1946, the ship was struck from the Navy list.

Awards
LST-934 earned two battle star for World War II service.

Notes

Citations

Bibliography 

Online resources

External links
 

 

LST-542-class tank landing ships
World War II amphibious warfare vessels of the United States
Ships built in Hingham, Massachusetts
1944 ships